Ravenstein is a railway station located in Ravenstein, Netherlands. The station originally opened on 4 June 1881 and is located on the Tilburg–Nijmegen railway. The services are currently operated by Nederlandse Spoorwegen.

Train services
The following services currently call at Ravenstein:
2x per hour local services (stoptrein) Nijmegen - Oss - 's-Hertogenbosch

Bus service

252

External links
NS website 
Dutch Public Transport journey planner 

Railway stations in Oss
Railway stations opened in 1881
1881 establishments in the Netherlands
Railway stations in the Netherlands opened in the 19th century